Guntersdorf is a market town in the district of Hollabrunn in Lower Austria, Austria. The market town of Guntersdorf has an area of 28.42 km2 and about 1,172 inhabitants.  The current mayor of Guntersdorf, Mag. Roland Weber took over for Günther Bradac in November 2013.

Geography
Guntersdorf lies in the Weinviertel in Lower Austria. Only about 1.2 percent of the municipality is forested.

References

Cities and towns in Hollabrunn District